The Virginia Living Museum is an open-air museum located in Newport News, Virginia that has many living exhibits of Virginia's indigenous species.  The exhibits include aspects of an aquarium, science center, aviary, botanical preserve and planetarium.

History
The first incarnation of what is now the Virginia Living Museum was the Junior Nature Museum and Planetarium, opened in 1966 under Virginia Governor Mills E. Godwin, Jr. and cofounded by the Junior League of Hampton Roads and the Warwick Rotary Club. In 1976, the facility was expanded and a new focus on physical and applied sciences was added to the existing natural sciences; at this time it was renamed the Peninsula Nature and Science Center.

The museum began its transformation to a "living museum", incorporating living exhibits and preservation land together with traditional exhibits, in 1983, following the example of the Arizona-Sonora Desert Museum. It reopened as the Virginia Living Museum in 1987 under Virginia governor Gerald L. Baliles. The museum expanded throughout the 1990s, opening the Coastal Plain Aviary in 2001 and a  museum building in 2004.

Exhibits

The main building features animals living in several exhibits that depict the many environments of Virginia, including the coastal plain, a  Chesapeake bay exhibit, the Piedmont, an Appalachian Mountain cove, a cypress swamp, and underground, as well as a gallery of nocturnal life.

Outdoors, the museum features a  aviary, a waterfall trail, a butterfly garden, and a 3/4 mile boardwalk with animals living in their natural habitats, including bobcats, river otters, beavers, raccoons, foxes, coyotes, deer  and red wolves.

References

External links
 The Virginia Living Museum website

Museums in Newport News, Virginia
Open-air museums in Virginia
Natural history museums in Virginia
Planetaria in the United States
Museums established in 1966
1966 establishments in Virginia
Institutions accredited by the American Alliance of Museums
Zoos in Virginia
Nature centers in Virginia